Tseng Shu-chin (born 14 August 1967 in Taitung, Taiwan) is a Taiwanese Truku singer-songwriter. She won the 1990 Golden Melody Award for Best Single Producer.

Discography
1988: 後浪
1989: 裝在袋子裡的回憶
1990: 一個人游游盪盪
1990: 孤單與自由
1992: 不再等待天堂
1993: 情生意動
1993: 曾淑勤金選集
1993: 珍抒情
1993: 說唱十二調
1993: 不再等待天堂
1994: 爱情外的路人
1996: 夢橋
2000: 曾淑勤
2001: A-vai來了
2004: 被遺忘的靈魂聲音
2013: 微日舞曲

References

External links
客途秋恨-曾淑勤 on YouTube

1967 births
20th-century Taiwanese women singers
21st-century Taiwanese women singers
Living people
People from Taitung County
Truku people